John Henry Durham (born March 16, 1950) is an American lawyer who served as the United States Attorney for the District of Connecticut (D. Conn.) from 2018 to 2021. By April 2019, he had been assigned to investigate the origins of the Federal Bureau of Investigation (FBI) investigation into Russian interference in the 2016 U.S. elections, and in October 2020 he was appointed special counsel for the Department of Justice on that matter.

He previously served as an assistant U.S. attorney in various positions in D.C. for 35 years. He is known for his role as special prosecutor in the 2005 destruction of interrogation tapes created by the Central Intelligence Agency (CIA), during which he decided not to file any criminal charges related to the destruction of tapes of torture at a CIA facility. 

By April 2019, U.S. Attorney General William Barr had tasked Durham with overseeing a review of the origins of the Russia investigation and to determine if intelligence collection involving the Trump campaign was "lawful and appropriate". Barr disclosed in December 2020 that he had elevated Durham's status to special counsel in October 2020, ensuring that the Durham special counsel investigation could continue after the Trump administration ended. After 3 years of investigation and prosecutions, Durham had secured one guilty plea and a probation sentence for a charge unrelated to the origins of the Russia investigation, and two unsuccessful trial prosecutions. Durham alleged at the two trials that the FBI had been deceived by the defendants but did not allege the FBI had acted improperly.

Early life and education 
Durham was born in Boston, Massachusetts. He earned a Bachelor of Arts degree from Colgate University in 1972  and a Juris Doctor from the University of Connecticut School of Law in 1975. After graduation, he was a VISTA volunteer for two years (1975–1977) on the Crow Indian Reservation in Montana.

Career

Connecticut state government 
After Durham's volunteer work, he became a state prosecutor in Connecticut. From 1977 to 1978, he served as a Deputy Assistant State's Attorney in the Office of the Chief State's Attorney. From 1978 to 1982, Durham served as an Assistant State's Attorney in the New Haven State's Attorney's Office.

Federal government 
Following those five years as a state prosecutor, Durham became a federal prosecutor, joining the U.S. Attorney's Office for the District of Connecticut. From 1982 to 1989, he served as an attorney and then supervisor in the New Haven Field Office of the Boston Strike Force in the Justice Department's Organized Crime and Racketeering Section. From 1989 to 1994, he served as Chief of the Office's Criminal Division. From 1994 to 2008, he served as the Deputy U.S. Attorney, and served as the U.S. Attorney in an acting and interim capacity in 1997 and 1998.

In December 2000, Durham revealed secret Federal Bureau of Investigation (FBI) documents that convinced a judge to vacate the 1968 murder convictions of Enrico Tameleo, Joseph Salvati, Peter J. Limone and Louis Greco because they had been framed by the agency. In 2007, the documents helped Salvati, Limone, and the families of the two other men, who had died in prison, win a $101.7 million civil judgment against the government.

In 2008, Durham led an inquiry into allegations that FBI agents and Boston Police had ties with the Mafia. He also led a series of high-profile prosecutions in Connecticut against the New England Mafia and corrupt politicians, including former Governor John G. Rowland.

From 2008 to 2012, Durham served as the acting U.S. Attorney for the Eastern District of Virginia.

On November 1, 2017, he was nominated by President Donald Trump to serve as U.S. Attorney for Connecticut. On February 16, 2018, his nomination was confirmed by voice vote of the Senate. He was sworn in on February 22, 2018.

In May 2019, William Barr chose Durham to lead a probe into the origins of the FBI's Crossfire Hurricane investigation and the Mueller special counsel investigation. On October 19, 2020, Barr appointed Durham Special Counsel to lead the Durham special counsel investigation in an effort to ensure the investigation continued after the Trump administration ended.

Durham resigned as U.S. Attorney effective February 28, 2021. He was one of 56 remaining Trump-appointed U.S. Attorneys President Joe Biden asked to resign in February 2021. He remains Special Counsel as of January 2023.

Appointments as special investigator

Whitey Bulger case 
Amid allegations that FBI informants James "Whitey" Bulger and Stephen "The Rifleman" Flemmi had corrupted their handlers, US Attorney General Janet Reno named Durham special prosecutor in 1999. He oversaw a task force of FBI agents brought in from other offices to investigate the Boston office's handling of informants. In 2002, Durham helped secure the conviction of retired FBI agent John J. Connolly Jr., who was sentenced to 10 years in prison on federal racketeering charges for protecting Bulger and Flemmi from prosecution and warning Bulger to flee just before the gangster's 1995 indictment. Durham's task force also gathered evidence against retired FBI agent H. Paul Rico, who was indicted in Oklahoma on state charges that he helped Bulger and Flemmi kill a Tulsa businessman in 1981. Rico died in 2004 before the case went to trial.

CIA interrogation tapes destruction 
In 2008, Durham was appointed by Attorney General Michael Mukasey to investigate the destruction of CIA videotapes of detainee interrogations. On November 8, 2010, Durham closed the investigation without recommending any criminal charges be filed. Durham's final report remains secret but was the subject of an unsuccessful lawsuit under the Freedom of Information Act filed by The New York Times reporter Charlie Savage.

Torture investigation 
In August 2009, Attorney General Eric Holder appointed Durham to lead the Justice Department's investigation of the legality of CIA's use of so-called "enhanced interrogation techniques" in the torture of detainees. Durham's mandate was to look at only those interrogations that had gone "beyond the officially sanctioned guidelines", with Holder saying interrogators who had acted in "good faith" based on the guidance found in the Torture Memos issued by the Bush Justice Department were not to be prosecuted. Later in 2009, University of Toledo law professor Benjamin G. Davis attended a conference where former officials of the Bush administration had told conference participants shocking stories, and accounts of illegality on the part of more senior Bush officials. Davis wrote an appeal to former Bush administration officials to take their accounts of illegality directly to Durham. A criminal investigation into the deaths of two detainees, Gul Rahman in Afghanistan and Manadel al-Jamadi in Iraq, was opened in 2011. It was closed in 2012 with no charges filed.

Special counsel to review origins of Trump-Russia investigation 

Beginning in 2017, Trump and his allies alleged that the FBI investigation (known as Crossfire Hurricane) of possible contacts between his associates and Russian officials (which led to the Mueller investigation) was a "hoax" or "witch hunt" that was baselessly initiated by his political enemies. In April 2019, Attorney General William Barr announced that he had launched a review of the origins of the FBI's investigation into Russian interference in the 2016 United States elections and it was reported in May that he had assigned Durham to lead it several weeks earlier. Durham was given the authority "to broadly examin[e] the government's collection of intelligence involving the Trump campaign's interactions with Russians," reviewing government documents and requesting voluntary witness statements. In December 2020, Barr revealed to Congress that he had secretly appointed Durham to lead the Durham special counsel investigation on October 19. He stayed on in this capacity after he resigned as U.S. Attorney. The U.S. Justice Department's first official expenditure report for the special investigation showed that it had spent $1.5 million from Oct 19, 2020, to March 31, 2021; Durham was not required to report expenditures made before being designated special counsel. By September 2022 the costs of his investigation has climbed to $6.5 million since assuming the role of special counsel.

After 3 years, Durham indicted three men, one of whom pleaded guilty to a charge unrelated to the origins of the FBI investigation, and was sentenced to probation; the other two men were tried and acquitted. In both trials, Durham alleged the defendants had deceived the FBI, rather than alleging the FBI acted improperly toward Trump.

Awards and accolades 
In 2011, Durham was included on The New Republics list of Washington's most powerful, least famous people.

In 2004, Durham was decorated with the Attorney General's Award for Exceptional Service and, in 2012, with the Attorney General's Award for Distinguished Service.

Personal life
According to CNN, Durham is "press-shy" and is known for his tendency to avoid the media. United States Attorney Deirdre Daly once described him as "tireless, fair and aggressive" while United States Senator Chris Murphy characterized him as "tough-nosed ... apolitical and serious".

See also 
Mueller report
Timeline of Russian interference in the 2016 United States elections
Timeline of investigations into Donald Trump and Russia (2019)
Timeline of investigations into Donald Trump and Russia (2020–2021)
Trump–Ukraine scandal

References

External links 
Biography at U.S. Department of Justice

1950 births
Colgate University alumni
Lawyers from Boston
Living people
Trump administration personnel
United States Attorneys for the District of Connecticut
Connecticut Republicans
Massachusetts Republicans
United States Department of Justice lawyers
University of Connecticut School of Law alumni
Special prosecutors